Ling Zhen is a fictional character in Water Margin, one of the Four Great Classical Novels in Chinese literature. Nicknamed "Heaven Shaking Thunder", he ranks 52nd among the 108 Stars of Destiny and 16th among the 72 Earthly Fiends.

Ling Zhen thisn, a native of Yanling (燕陵; believed to be present-day Yanling County, Henan), is good in archery and fights well. But he is better known for his skill in the making and firing of cannons. The top cannoneer in the Song Empire during his time, he serves as an artillery officer in the imperial capital Dongjing.

Becoming an outlaw
Emperor Huizong appoints Huyan Zhuo to exterminate the bandits of Liangshan Marsh, at the recommendation of Grand Marshal Gao Qiu, whose cousin Gao Lian, governor of Gaotangzhou, was defeated and killed by the outlaws.

In his first encounter with Liangshan, Huyan is shaken by the capture of Peng Qi, one of his two lieutenants, by the bandits. But he gains the upper hand with his cavalry consisting of groups of chain-linked armoured horses, which charge forward in unison. Overwhelmed, the outlaws have to hole up in their stronghold with the marsh as the buffer as they ponder how to counterattack . Unable to cross the waters, Huyan writes to request the court to send Ling Zhen, who could assail the bandits with cannons. Ling arrives and shells the stronghold, with some cannons hitting the shores beyond the marsh, shocking the outlaws.

Wu Yong sends swimmers to steal up to Ling Zheng's artillery platform set up by the bank and overturn it. Incensed, Ling chases after the saboteurs, who lure him into the marsh. His boat is capsized there by men hiding under water. Captured and brought before Song Jiang, Ling is won over by the latter's warm treatment. He later contributes to the defeat of Huyan Zhuo by startling his cavalry horses with cannon blasts while Liangshan's hooked lance squad pull them to the ground.

Campaigns
Ling Zhen is put in charge of the making of cannons after the 108 Stars of Destiny came together in what is called the Grand Assembly. In battles he would deploy and fire cannons when required. He participates in the campaigns against the Liao invaders and rebel forces in Song territory following amnesty from Emperor Huizong for Liangshan. In the campaign against Fang La, Ling Zhen is often called upon to bombard enemy cities to create chaos before attack commences. 

Ling Zhen is one of the few Liangshan heroes who survive all the campaigns. He is reinstated as artillery officer in the imperial army.

References
 
 
 
 
 
 
 

72 Earthly Fiends
Fictional characters from Henan